Henrique Viana (Lisbon, June 29, 1936 — Lisbon, July 4, 2007) was a Portuguese actor who worked in theatre, cinema and television. He died of cancer in Capuchos Hospital, aged 71.

Filmography
Aqui Há Fantasmas (1964) by Pedro Martins
A Maluquinha de Arroios (1970) by Henrique Campos
Malteses, Burgueses e às Vezes... (1974) by Artur Semedo
A Fuga (1977) by Luís Filipe Rocha
Amor de Perdição (1979) by Manoel de Oliveira
A Santa Aliança (1980) by Eduardo Geada
A Vida é Bela...!? (1982) by Luís Galvão Teles
Antes a Sorte que Tal Morte (1983) by João Matos Silva
Sem Sombra de Pecado (1983) by José Fonseca e Costa
Um Adeus Português (1985) by João Botelho
Balada da Praia dos Cães (1986) by José Fonseca e Costa
Duma Vez por Todas (1986) by Joaquim Leitão
Saudades Para Dona Genciana (1986) by Eduardo Geada
Máscara de Aço Contra Abismo Azul (1988) by Paulo Rocha
Tempos Difíceis (1988) by João Botelho
O Querido Lilás (1989) by Artur Semedo
Recordações da Casa Amarela (1989) by João César Monteiro
Segno di fuoco (1990) by Nino Bizzarri
Amor e Dedinhos de Pé (1991) by Luís Filipe Rocha
Nuvem (1991) by Ana Luísa Guimarães
O Sangue (1991) by Pedro Costa
Um Crime de Luxo (1991) by Artur Semedo
Vertigem (1991) by Leandro Ferreira
Ladrão Que Rouba a Anão Tem Cem Anos de Prisão (1992) by Jorge Paixão da Costa
No Dia dos Meus Anos (1992) by João Botelho
Requiem para um Narciso (1992) by João Pedro Ruivo
Rosa Negra (1992) by Margarida Gil
Viuvez Secreta (1992) by Jorge Marecos Duarte
 (1993) by Joël Farges
Aqui Na Terra (1993) by João Botelho
O Fim do Mundo (1993) by João Mário Grilo
Adeus Princesa (1994) by Jorge Paixão da Costa
Eternidade (1995) by Quirino Simões
Sinais de Fogo (1995) by Luís Filipe Rocha
Elas (1997) by Luís Galvão Teles
Longe da Vista (1998) by João Mário Grilo
O Anjo da Guarda (1999) by Margarida Gil
O Lampião da Estrela (2000) by Diamantino Costa
Capitães de Abril (2000) by Maria de Medeiros
451 Forte (2001) by João Mário Grilo
A Bomba (2001) by Leonel Vieira
A Falha (2002) by João Mário Grilo
O Rapaz do Trapézio Voador (2002) by Fernando Matos Silva
Portugal S.A. (2003) by Ruy Guerra

TV series 
Chuva na Areia (1985)
Sozinhos Em Casa (1993)
Os Imparáveis (1996)
Camilo na Prisão (1998)
Esquadra de Polícia (1999)
Alves dos Reis (2001)
Processo dos Távoras (2001)
Inspector Max (2005)
Bocage (2006)
Morangos com Açúcar (2006)
Paixões Proibidas (2007)

References

External links

People from Lisbon
Portuguese male film actors
Portuguese male television actors
1936 births
2007 deaths
Deaths from cancer in Portugal